Md Fakhrul Ahsan, BSP, ndu, psc is a major general in the Bangladesh Army and Force Commander for MINURSO, the UN peacekeeping mission in the Sahara. Prior to join there he was GOC of the 10th Infantry Division and & Area Commander, Cox's Bazar Area. Prior to join 10th Infantry as GOC, he served as Commandant of Bangladesh Military Academy (BMA) in Bhatiary, Chattogram.

Career 
Major General Fakhrul Ahsan was selected at the ISSB for the 19th (BMA) Long Course and was commissioned in 1988. During his posting as Director of Army military intelligence he played a significant role in 'Operation Twilight' in Shibbari area of Sylhet, the longest and most complex counter-terror (CT) operation in the history of Bangladesh.  In his long career, he also served as Assistant Defence Attaché at Bangladesh High Commission in New Delhi, India and in two peacekeeping missions, in Somalia (UNOSOM-II) and the Democratic Republic of the Congo (MONUC).

References 

Bangladesh Army generals
Bangladeshi generals
Year of birth missing (living people)
Living people